Crockett Mills is an unincorporated community in Crockett County, Tennessee, United States. Its ZIP code is 38021.

Notes

Unincorporated communities in Crockett County, Tennessee
Unincorporated communities in Tennessee